Fritzon is a surname. People with the surname include:

 Anna-Lena Fritzon (born 1965), Swedish skier 
 Heléne Fritzon (born 1960), Swedish politician
 Henrik Fritzon (born 1972), Swedish politician 
 Jean-Baptiste Fritzson (born 1986), Haitian football player

Surnames of Swedish origin